Abdur Rehman (15 December 1917 – 22 October 2000) was a Pakistani cricketer who played first-class cricket in British India from 1937 to 1941 and in Pakistan from 1948 to 1960.

Abdur Rehman played as a wicketkeeper for Southern Punjab in the Ranji Trophy from 1936-37 to 1941-42. Later, in Pakistan, he played as a batsman and occasional pace bowler.

He scored one of the first centuries in Pakistani first-class cricket when he made 108 opening the batting for the Punjab Governor's XI against Punjab University in 1948-49. A few days later he was a member of Pakistan's first tour when they visited Ceylon, but he did not play in the international matches on the tour.
 
He scored 48 and 89 when Combined Services beat Karachi in the first round of the inaugural Quaid-e-Azam Trophy in 1953-54. He continued to play for Combined Services until 1960-61.

He umpired three first-class matches in Pakistan between 1968 and 1971. His much younger brother Fazal-ur-Rehman played Test cricket for Pakistan in 1958.

References

External links
 
 Abdur Rehman at CricketArchive

1917 births
2000 deaths
Cricketers from Amritsar
Pakistani cricketers
Southern Punjab cricketers
Combined Services (Pakistan) cricketers